Chydarteres striatus is a species of beetle in the family Cerambycidae. It was described by Johan Christian Fabricius in 1787, and while his name was preoccupied, it is treated as valid following ICZN Article 23.9.5.

References

Trachyderini
Beetles described in 1787